Caronte is a Spanish drama television series created by Verónica Fernández and produced by Mediaset España in collaboration with Big Bang Media. It made its debut in March 2020 on Amazon Prime Video before its free-to-air broadcasting.

Premise 
Samuel Caronte (Roberto Álamo), a police officer, is convicted for a crime he did not commit. While in prison, he graduated in law. After leaving prison, he becomes a lawyer, partnering with Marta Pelayo (Miriam Giovanelli), vowing to represent those who do not have access to an adequate legal defence.

The fiction takes place in between Gijón and Madrid.

Cast 
 Roberto Álamo as Samuel Caronte.
 Miriam Giovanelli as Marta Pelayo.
 Carlos Hipólito as Comisario Paniagua.
 Belén López as Julia.
  as Aurelio.
 Álex Villazán as Guille.
 Marta Larralde as Natalia.
  as Irina.
  as Paula.
 Sofía Oria as Irene.
  as Ignacio.
 Julieta Serrano as Samuel Caronte's mother.
With the special collaboration of
 Nathalie Poza.
 Miguel Bernardeau.
 Marta Nieto.
 Candela Serrat.

Production and release 
Created by Verónica Fernández, the series is a mashup of legal drama, police drama and family drama. It was produced by Mediaset España in collaboration with Big Bang Media. Shooting began in November 2018, and it took place in Madrid and Gijón. Joaquín Llamas, Sandra Gallego, Alberto Ruiz-Rojo and Jesús Font directed the episodes. Consisting of 13 episodes with a running time of about 75 minutes, the series was launched on Amazon Prime Video on 6 March 2020. After its release on Prime Video, Mediaset España chose Cuatro rather than its flagship channel Telecinco for the free-to-air broadcasting of the series. The first episode aired on Cuatro on 15 March 2021 earned "good" ratings (1,119,000 viewers and a 7.9% share), above the channel's average.

References 

Spanish-language Amazon Prime Video original programming
Television shows set in Asturias
Television shows set in Madrid
Television shows filmed in Spain
2020 Spanish television series debuts
2020 Spanish television series endings
2020s Spanish drama television series
Spanish legal drama television series
Spanish-language television shows